Sally Hemings has been represented in the media in popular culture due to her association with Thomas Jefferson. She has been portrayed in films and the inspiration for novels, plays and music.

Literature
1853, William Wells Brown, known as the first African-American novelist, published his Clotel; or, The President's Daughter, a novel about a mixed-race daughter and based on the Jefferson-Hemings story. 
1974, Fawn McKay Brodie published her psychobiography, Thomas Jefferson: An Intimate History, which seriously examined the evidence of Jefferson's relationship with Sally Hemings and was a bestseller. Together with articles about the issue and Jefferson-Hemings descendants in American Heritage magazine in 1974 and 1976, popular attention was attracted to the controversy, as her conclusion was vigorously resisted by mainline historians.
1979, Barbara Chase-Riboud's novel Sally Hemings became a bestseller. Hers was the first novel in which an author had portrayed Sally Hemings as a fully realized person. CBS began to adapt the popular novel as a miniseries, but prominent historians Virginius Dabney (a descendant of Jefferson's sister Martha) and Dumas Malone successfully campaigned against it with the network's president William S. Paley, and persuaded him to kill the project.
1993, Steve Erickson's novel Arc d'X features Hemings as one of the main characters.
2016 Sally Hemings is a main character in the historical novel "America's First Daughter" by Stephanie Dray and Laura Kamoie. The novel draws heavily upon Jefferson's letters and includes his relationship with Hemmings starting in Paris.
2016, Stephen O'Connell's Thomas Jefferson Dreams of Sally Hemings depicts the relationship between Hemings and Jefferson.

In television
1976, the opening episode  of the third season of the TV series, The Jeffersons, was entitled "George and the President," and had a plot linked to the Jefferson–Hemings controversy. 
1986, In an episode of Head of the Class, Darlene Merrimen (played by actress Robin Givens) learns that she is a descendant of Sally Hemings.
2000, Sally Hemings: An American Scandal, was a CBS television miniseries (air dates: February 13, 2000 and February 16, 2000; writer: Tina Andrews director: Charles Haid; with Carmen Ejogo as Hemings and Sam Neill as Thomas Jefferson). As PBS noted in a Frontline program, "Though many quarrelled with the portrayal of Hemings as unrealistically modern and heroic, no major historian challenged the series' premise that Hemings and Jefferson had a 38-year relationship that produced children."
2000, PBS Frontline had an extensive documentary program entitled Jefferson's Blood, about the issues of DNA, historical evidence related to Jefferson's likely paternity of Hemings's children, and the significance of the controversy and its issues in American history. Documentary material is on the website for this program.
 2002,  Saturday Night Live parodied the relationship of Hemings and Jefferson titled Thomas Jefferson Meets Sally Hemings in Season 28, Episode 8. Hemings was portrayed by comedian Maya Rudolph, while Jefferson was portrayed by actor Robert De Niro.
 2008, HBO's miniseries John Adams briefly shows Sally Hemings in its final episode, "Peacefield (1803 A.D. – 1826 A.D.)". Hemings, played by actress Lizan Mitchell, is shown comforting Jefferson, played by Stephen Dillane, as he dies at Monticello; and crying openly once he has died. 
2013, Sleepy Hollow, a television series on Fox, the episode "Midnight Ride" references an affair between Thomas Jefferson and Sally Hemings, citing DNA evidence as proof to the lead character, Ichabod Crane, who knew Jefferson.

In film
1995, Jefferson in Paris, a film, portrayed the early relationship between Sally Hemings (played by Thandie Newton) and Jefferson (Nick Nolte).

In opera
2012, Tom and Sally in Paris is a two-act opera with libretto and music by William Lavonis; he explores Jefferson and Hemings' relationship during the French Revolution.

2016, Monticello Wakes is an opera with libretto by Tim Appelo and music by Garrett Fisher; it focuses on Sally Hemings, her lookalike sister Martha Jefferson, and Thomas Jefferson, and was produced at Loyola Marymount University Los Angeles and accompanied by Tori Ellison's bronze public sculpture installed at City Hall, commissioned by the Mayor of Inglewood, California, who proclaimed the world's first Sally Hemings Day. The sculpture is near Frederick M. Roberts Park, named after Sally Hemings' descendant, who signed legislation to create UCLA, as Thomas Jefferson had created the University of Virginia. In the audience at the premiere was LMU professor Rosalynde Loo, a descendant of Sally's sister Mary.

In theater
2015, In the musical Hamilton, Sally Hemings briefly appears and has a dance solo in "What'd I Miss", the opening to Act II.
2017, Thomas & Sally by Thomas Bradshaw depicted the relationship between Thomas Jefferson and Sally Hemings. This depiction was met with controversy over the question of consent.

In music
2001: From the Diary of Sally Hemings, with a text by author and professor Sandra Seaton, is a song cycle by the American composer William Bolcom; it was premiered at the Library of Congress. The Jefferson-Hemings descendants attended the premiere.
2015: On the Hamilton cast album, Sally Hemings is mentioned very briefly on the track "What'd I Miss?".
2016: On The Hamilton Mixtape album, Sally Hemings is mentioned as a sly reference in the track "Cabinet Battle 3 (demo)."

In art 
 American artist Titus Kaphar's 2014 piece "Behind the Myth of Benevolence" features a classical oil portrait of Thomas Jefferson, drawn back to reveal the painting of a naked slave woman beneath the canvas. Although the reference to Hemings is clear, by the artist's own admission the portrayal does not match her reported appearance (she was described as light-skinned with straight hair), instead presenting her with more african features to be a broader representation of enslaved women invisibilized by traditional American history.
 American artist Martin Puryear included a piece titled A Column for Sally Hemings in the 2019 Venice Bienniale.

References 

Cultural depictions of American women
Cultural depictions of slaves
Cultural depictions of activists
 
Cultural depictions of Black people
Sally Hemings